Asparuh Peak is a peak situated on Livingston Island, Antarctica.  The peak rises to 760m in Bowles Ridge and is linked to the Melnik Ridge by the 575m high Yankov Gap.  It was named after Khan Asparuh of Bulgaria, 668-700 AD, who incorporated by treaty the territory between the Balkan Mountains and the Danube in 681 AD.

Location

See also
 List of Bulgarian toponyms in Antarctica
 Antarctic Place-names Commission

Maps
 L.L. Ivanov et al. Antarctica: Livingston Island and Greenwich Island, South Shetland Islands. Scale 1:100000 topographic map. Sofia: Antarctic Place-names Commission of Bulgaria, 2005.
 L.L. Ivanov. Antarctica: Livingston Island and Greenwich, Robert, Snow and Smith Islands. Scale 1:120000 topographic map.  Troyan: Manfred Wörner Foundation, 2009.

References
 Asparuh Peak. SCAR Composite Gazetteer of Antarctica.
 Bulgarian Antarctic Gazetteer. Antarctic Place-names Commission. (details in Bulgarian, basic data in English)

External links
 Asparuh Peak. Copernix satellite image

Mountains of Livingston Island
Bulgaria and the Antarctic